Musical Instrument Museum or Museum of Musical Instruments may refer to:

Worldwide:
Accademia Nazionale di Santa Cecilia Musical Instruments Museum, Rome, Italy
Bate Collection of Musical Instruments, Oxford, United Kingdom
Berlin Musical Instrument Museum, Germany
Eboardmuseum, Klagenfurt, Austria
Galleria Borghèse - The National Museum of Musical Instruments, Rome, Italy
Gurminj Museum of Musical Instruments, Dushanbe, Tajikistan
Musée de la musique - Cité de la musique, Paris, France
Museum of Greek Folk Musical Instruments, Athens, Greece
Museum of Musical Instruments, Céret, France
Museum of Musical Instruments of Leipzig University, Germany
Museum of Musical Instruments (Florence), Italy
Museum of Musical Instruments (Milan), Italy
Museum of Portuguese Music
Music Museum (Basel), Switzerland
Musical Instrument Museum, Brussels, Belgium
Musical Instrument Museum (Volgograd), Russia
Povilas Stulga Museum of Lithuanian Folk Instruments, Kaunas, Lithuania
Stringed Instruments Museum, Tebosa, Portugal

United States:
Metropolitan Museum of Art Musical Instrument Collection, New York, New York, United States
Museum of Making Music, Carlsbad, California, United States
Musical Instrument Museum (Phoenix), Arizona, United States
National Music Museum, Vermillion, South Dakota, United States
Schubert Club Museum of Musical Instruments, St. Paul, Minnesota, United States
Songbirds Guitar Museum Guitar museum in Chattanooga, Tennessee, United States
Yale University Collection of Musical Instruments, New Haven, Connecticut, United States

See also
Mandolin Melodies Museum, Nagoya, Japan
:Category:Musical instrument museums